Katie Rose Lucas (born April 13, 1988) is an American actress and writer. She is the daughter of filmmaker George Lucas, god-daughter of both Steven Spielberg and Francis Ford Coppola, younger sister of Amanda Lucas, and older sister of Jett Lucas and Everest Hobson Lucas. Her father adopted her and Jett as a single parent.

Lucas had minor roles in all three Star Wars prequels. She portrayed young Anakin's friend, Amee, in The Phantom Menace; the purple Twi'lek girl Lunae Minx in Attack of the Clones; and Senator Chi Eekway in Revenge of the Sith.

Lucas was a writer for the Star Wars: The Clone Wars TV series.

Filmography
 Star Wars: Episode I – The Phantom Menace (1999) – Amee (as Jenna Green)
 The Beginning: Making 'Episode I''' (2001) – Herself
 Star Wars: Episode II – Attack of the Clones (2002) – Lunae Minx (uncredited)
 Ben and Holly (2005) – Little Sister (as Jenna Green)
 Star Wars: Episode III – Revenge of the Sith (2005) – Chi Eekway

WriterStar Wars: The Clone Wars''
 "Jedi Crash"
 "Sphere of Influence", with Steve Melching
 "The Academy", with Steven Melching 
 "Assassin"
 "Nightsisters" Trilogy:
 "Nightsisters"
 "Monster"
 "Witches of the Mist"
 "Darth Maul Returns" Arc:
 "Massacre"
 "Bounty"
 "Brothers"
 "Revenge"
 "Order 66 Genesis" Arc:
 "Unknown"
 "Conspiracy"
 "Fugitive"
 "Orders"

References

External links

 All Media Guide

1988 births
American child actresses
Living people
20th-century American actresses
21st-century American actresses
George Lucas
American film actresses
American television writers
American adoptees